Darantasia ecxathia is a moth of the subfamily Arctiinae. It is found on Goodenough Island.

References

Nudariina